Grevena (Grevená) is a town and municipality in Western Macedonia, northern Greece, capital of the Grevena regional unit. The town's current population is 13,374 citizens (2011). The municipality's population is 25,905. Grevena has had access to the Egnatia Odos since the early 2000s, which now connects Igoumenitsa with Thessaloniki and Alexandroupoli at the border with Turkey. Mountains surround the municipality, which is situated by the river Greveniotikos, which itself flows into the Aliakmon. Other significant towns in the municipality are Amygdaliés and Méga Seiríni. Grevena Municipal Museum is located in the town.

History

Ottoman period

Under Ottoman rule, Grevena (Ottoman name Gerebena) was the seat of the kaza of Grevena, Sanjak of Serfice, Manastir Vilayet. According to the statistics of Vasil Kanchov ("Macedonia, Ethnography and Statistics"), 600 Greek Christians, 500 Turks, 200 Vallahades (Greek-speaking Muslims), 150 Aromanians and 100 Romani lived in the town in 1900.

1995 earthquake
The earthquake that occurred in the region on 13 May 1995 was 6.6 on the Richter magnitude scale, but it caused only material damage. The worst hit area was the county of Ventzia. There were two foreshocks of lesser intensity that preceded the main earthquake by a few minutes and warned people. These warnings sent the population out of their houses. When the main earthquake came, it destroyed nearly all the houses in several villages of the Ventzia County – the houses collapsed to the ground – but all the inhabitants were outside. 
 
Another earthquake on 5 January 2005 measured 4.9 near Grevena. It took place at 20:00 local time (EET), and no damage was reported. Another earthquake with a measured intensity of 5.4 occurred on 17 July 2007 at 21:23 local time (EET) and was followed by weak aftershocks. Some older buildings were lightly damaged in villages northeast of Grevena.

Administrative division

Municipality

The municipality Grevena was formed at the 2011 local government reform by the merger of the following 13 former municipalities, that became municipal units:
Agios Kosmas
Dotsiko
Filippaioi
Gorgiani
Grevena
Irakleotes
Mesolouri
Samarina
Smixi
Theodoros Ziakas
Ventzio

Municipal unit
The municipal unit of Grevena is divided into the following communities:
 Agioi Theodoroi
 Amygdalies
 Elatos
 Elefthero
 Felli
 Kalochi
 Kyrakali
 Megalo Seirini
 Myrsina
 Rodia
 Megaro
 Vatolakkos

Community
The community of Grevena consists of three separate settlements: 
Doxaras (population 208)
Grevena (population 13,137)
Kalamitsi (population 29)

Education
Two departments of the university of Western Macedonia based in the city, the departments of Statistics and Insurance Science and Business Administration.

Economy
In the area, there is large production of mushrooms, collected in the Valia Calda area. It is also the place of production of Anevato cheese.

Climate
Grevena has a mediterranean continental climate characterized by a great diurnal temperature variation. Winters are cold with frequent snowfalls, whereas summers are hot during the day and cool during the night.

Historical population

Population statistics, 1981-2011.

People
Theodoros Ziakas, fighter in the Greek revolution
Konstantinos Dimidis, fighter in the Greek revolution
Kostas Koutsomytis, director
Kostas Papanikolaou, former NBA player
Miltiadis Tentoglou, Olympic and European champion long jumper
Eva Chantava, volleyball player

References

External links
Official website 
Dasilio Grevenon 
Grevena (municipality) on GTP Travel Pages (in English and Greek)
Grevena (town) on GTP Travel Pages (in English and Greek)
Awarded "EDEN - European Destinations of Excellence" non traditional tourist destination 2008

Populated places in Grevena (regional unit)
Municipalities of Western Macedonia
Aromanian settlements in Greece